Kamionek is a district of Warsaw.

Kamionek may also refer to the following places in Poland:
Kamionek, Greater Poland Voivodeship (west-central Poland)
Kamionek, Kuyavian-Pomeranian Voivodeship (north-central Poland)
Kamionek, Opole Voivodeship (south-west Poland)
Kamionek, Warmian-Masurian Voivodeship (north Poland)